Minnow on the Say is a Canadian children's adventure television series which aired on CBC Television in 1960. It is based on the 1955 novel of the same title by Philippa Pearce, who later wrote the classic Tom's Midnight Garden. (Her first novel was adapted for British television in 1972, as Treasure over the Water.)

Premise
This Vancouver-produced dramatic series featured two boys and their canoe, The Minnow, as they seek treasure along the Sayfor River. The treasure was buried in 1588 by an ancestor of the boys. Peter Statner adapted the story for broadcast.

Scheduling
15-minute episodes were broadcast on Fridays at 5:00 p.m. from 1 April to 24 June 1960.

References

External links

 

CBC Television original programming
1960 Canadian television series debuts
1960 Canadian television series endings
1960s Canadian children's television series
Black-and-white Canadian television shows
Canadian television shows based on children's books
Television shows based on British novels